The vice president of Venezuela, officially known as the Executive Vice President of the Bolivarian Republic of Venezuela, is the second highest political position in the government of Venezuela. The vice president is the direct collaborator of the Venezuelan president according to the Constitution. The office of vice president appeared in the Constitution of 1830 until the Constitution of 1858, and once again in the Constitution of 1999. However, in its current (1999) incarnation, the office is more akin to a prime minister in systems as those of France and South Korea.

Since June 14, 2018, Delcy Rodríguez of the United Socialist Party of Venezuela has been vice president, serving with President Nicolás Maduro.

Office of the executive vice president

Functions and duties
According to the Constitution of 1999, the duties of the executive vice president are  
 To collaborate with the president of the Republic to direct the actions of the Government.
 To coordinate the Public National Administration in accordance with the instructions of the president of the Republic.
 To propose the appointment and the removal of the ministers to the president of the Republic.
 To preside over the Cabinet if the president is absent or with authorization in advance from the president.
 To coordinate the relations of the National Executive with the National Assembly.
 To preside at the Federal Council of Government.
 To name and to remove, in accordance with the law, the officials or national officials whose designation is not attributed to another authority.
 To substitute for the president of the Republic on temporary and absolute absences.
 To exercise the duties delegated to him by the president of the Republic.

Appointment and removal
The executive vice president is appointed and removed by the president. The vice president can also be removed with more than two-thirds of the votes in National Assembly. If the National Assembly removes three vice presidents from office during a six-year presidential term, the president is authorized to dissolve the Parliament.

Presidential succession
The executive vice president is the first in line to the succession of the president of Venezuela, when the president is unable to fulfill the duties of office in the exceptional cases established in the Article 233 and 234 of the National Constitution.

Former vice presidents Andrés Navarte, Carlos Soublette, Diosdado Cabello (in April 2002) and Nicolás Maduro (in 2012–2013) were all once acting presidents of Venezuela. Soublette and Maduro were also later elected as president.

List of vice presidents of Venezuela

State of Venezuela (1830–1864)

Fifth Republic (1999–present)

See also
List of presidents of Venezuela
List of current vice presidents

References
Sources
Vicepresidency of the Republic 
Citations

Executive branch of the government of Venezuela
Venezuela